Micerlanio Fernandes da Silva (born April 24, 1985 in Caaporã), known as Fernandes, is a Brazilian footballer who plays for Remo as midfielder.

Career statistics

References

External links

1985 births
Living people
Brazilian footballers
Association football forwards
Campeonato Brasileiro Série B players
Campeonato Brasileiro Série C players
Campeonato Brasileiro Série D players
Botafogo Futebol Clube (PB) players
América Futebol Clube (RN) players
Treze Futebol Clube players
Campinense Clube players
Oeste Futebol Clube players
Esporte Clube XV de Novembro (Piracicaba) players
Associação Desportiva São Caetano players
Paraná Clube players